Al Harris may refer to:

 Al Harris (defensive lineman) (born 1956), Alfred
 Al Harris (cornerback) (born 1974), Alshinard

See also
Alan Harris (disambiguation)
Albert Harris (disambiguation)
Alex Harris (disambiguation)
Alexander Harris (disambiguation)
Alfred Harris (disambiguation)